Tazewell Augustus Eure (April 5, 1875 – April 6, 1954) was an American banker, farmer, and politician who served in the North Carolina House of Representatives, representing his native Gates County from 1925 to 1929. His son, Thad, served in the House from 1929 to 1931 and as North Carolina Secretary of State from 1936 to 1989.

References

External links 

1875 births
1954 deaths
Democratic Party members of the North Carolina House of Representatives
20th-century American politicians